Gumede is a surname. Notable people with the name include:

 Gumede kaZulu (18th century), Zulu king
 Archie Gumede (1914–1998), South African anti-apartheid activist, lawyer and politician
 Josiah Tshangana Gumede (1867–1946), South African politician
 Josiah Zion Gumede (1919–1989), Zimbabwean politician
 Natalie Gumede (born 1984), British actress
 Nkosingiphile Gumede (born 1993), South African football goalkeeper
 Siboniso Gumede (born 1985), South African football defender
 Tshepo Gumede (born 1991), South African footballer
 Zandile Gumede (born 1961), South African politician

Bantu-language surnames